The following article outlines statistics for Copa América Centenario, which took place in the United States from 3 to 26 June 2016.

Player statistics

Goalscorers

6 goals

 Eduardo Vargas

5 goals

 Lionel Messi

4 goals

 Gonzalo Higuaín

3 goals

 Philippe Coutinho
 Alexis Sánchez
 Clint Dempsey

2 goals

 Ezequiel Lavezzi
 Erik Lamela
 Renato Augusto
 José Pedro Fuenzalida
 Edson Puch
 Arturo Vidal
 Carlos Bacca
 James Rodríguez
 Enner Valencia
 Blas Pérez
 Salomón Rondón

1 goal

 Sergio Agüero
 Éver Banega
 Víctor Cuesta
 Ángel Di María
 Nicolás Otamendi
 Juan Carlos Arce
 Jhasmani Campos
 Gabriel Barbosa
 Lucas Lima
 Charles Aránguiz
 Frank Fabra
 Marlos Moreno
 Cristián Zapata
 Celso Borges
 Johan Venegas
 Michael Arroyo
 Jaime Ayoví
 Miller Bolaños
 Christian Noboa
 Antonio Valencia
 James Marcelin
 Jesús Manuel Corona
 Javier Hernández
 Héctor Herrera
 Rafael Márquez
 Oribe Peralta
 Abdiel Arroyo
 Miguel Camargo
 Víctor Ayala
 Christian Cueva
 Edison Flores
 Paolo Guerrero
 Raúl Ruidíaz
 Jermaine Jones
 Bobby Wood
 Gyasi Zardes
 Graham Zusi
 Mathías Corujo
 Diego Godín
 Abel Hernández
 Josef Martínez
 José Manuel Velázquez

1 own goal
 Frank Fabra (against Costa Rica)
 Je-Vaughn Watson (against Uruguay)
 Álvaro Pereira (against Mexico)

Source: CONMEBOL WorldFootball.net

Assists

4 assists

 Lionel Messi

3 assists

 Clint Dempsey

2 assists

 Ángel Di María
 Marcos Rojo
 Dani Alves
 Arturo Vidal
 Edwin Cardona
 Enner Valencia
 Jefferson Montero
 Raúl Jiménez
 Paolo Guerrero
 Alejandro Guerra

1 assist

 Éver Banega
 Nicolás Gaitán
 Gonzalo Higuaín
 Ezequiel Lavezzi
 Elias
 Filipe Luís
 Gil
 Jonas
 Jean Beausejour
 José Pedro Fuenzalida
 Fabián Orellana
 Mauricio Pinilla
 Alexis Sánchez
 Eduardo Vargas
 Santiago Arias
 Juan Cuadrado
 Roger Martínez
 James Rodríguez
 Celso Borges
 Bryan Oviedo
 Walter Ayoví
 Christian Noboa
 Antonio Valencia
 Jesús Manuel Corona
 Héctor Herrera
 Abdiel Arroyo
 Gabriel Gómez
 Alberto Quintero
 Edison Flores
 Andy Polo
 Jermaine Jones
 Bobby Wood
 Gyasi Zardes
 Nicolás Lodeiro
 Carlos Sánchez
 Christian Santos

Source: CONMEBOL WorldFootball.net

Clean sheets

4 clean sheets

 Sergio Romero

3 clean sheets

 Claudio Bravo
 David Ospina
 Pedro Gallese

2 clean sheets

 Brad Guzan
 Dani Hernández

1 clean sheet

 Alisson
 Patrick Pemberton
 Alexander Domínguez
 Esteban Dreer
 Guillermo Ochoa
 Justo Villar
 Fernando Muslera

Scoring
Overview

Timing

Teams

Individual

Attendance
Overall attendance: 1,401,829
Average attendance per match: 
Highest attendance: 83,263 – Mexico vs Jamaica
Lowest attendance: 11,937 – Ecuador vs Peru

Wins and losses

Discipline

Summary

Sanctions

By match

By referee

By team

By individual

Overall statistics

Notes

References

External links
 Copa América Centenario statistics at CONMEBOL center

statistics
2016